The Mirage 39 is a Canadian sailboat, that was designed by H. Morton and first built in 1989.

Production
The boat was the final design built by Mirage Yachts in Canada, with only a few completed before the company was sold and all production ended later in 1989.

Design
The Mirage 39 is a small recreational keelboat, built predominantly of fiberglass. It has a masthead sloop rig and a fixed fin keel. It displaces  and carries  of ballast.

The boat has a PHRF racing average handicap of 111.

See also
List of sailing boat types

Similar sailboats
C&C 39
C&C 40
CS 40
Santana 39

References

External links
 Photo of a Mirage 39

Keelboats
1980s sailboat type designs
Sailing yachts
Sailboat type designs by H. Morton
Sailboat types built by Mirage Yachts